The Simon Pytlovany House is a historic house in Fayette County, Texas. It is an example of immigrants bringing building styles to their new homes. The house is built in the style of a Ukrainian Izba. It was listed on the National Register of Historic Places on April 14, 1975 and designated a Recorded Texas Historic Landmark.

Construction
It is built from large timbers  square. The frame was first built upside down with the ceiling framework on the ground, it was then disassembled and put together upright. Splice and hole fittings, not nails, were used. This was not only structurally strong but facilitated the assemble, disassemble, invert, reassemble process. The space was filled with a pseudo adobe of mud, shelled maize head and horse manure. The manure created a stronger chemical bond and provided undigested straw. The walls were  when completed. Twigs and sticks were added as needed for reinforcement and a top coating of yellow clay and straw served as a finishing plaster and preservative.

Simon Pytlovany
Simon Pytlovany immigrated from Ukraine in 1896 with his wife, two children and father arriving in Galveston, Texas. After several moves he was a share cropper in Dubina until he bought this property in 1904 and built the home there in 1909. The structural timbers used to build the house were from a church destroyed in a hurricane that year. Pytlovany's design for his house closely resembles the plan of a traditional Ukrainian Izba with its modified rectangular plan with additions and entry on the long sides and steeply gabled shingled roof.

References

External links

 

National Register of Historic Places in Fayette County, Texas
Buildings and structures completed in 1909